Charlie Beech (born 21 July 1987 in Stevenage, England) is a rugby union player for Coventry R.F.C. in the RFU Championship. He plays as a prop.

Beech represented England at the U19 World Championship in 2006. Beech also represented the England under-20 team in the 2007 Six Nations.

Beech joined the academy of Northampton Saints in 2003, he made one appearance for their senior side, against Rugby Viadana in the European Challenge Cup. After Saints were relegated in the 2006–07 season, Beech signed for London Wasps.

Beech made his competitive debut for Wasps against London Irish, in their first win of the 2007–08 Guinness Premiership. He would have to wait another 13 months before his next appearance, when he scored a match winning try against the Newcastle Falcons. In April 2009, Beech signed a contract.

It was announced on 8 March 2011 that Beech had signed for Bath on a three-year deal. In October 2013, Beech signed for Yorkshire Carnegie on an indefinite loan from the rest of the 2013–14 season. However, he signed a permanent deal with Yorkshire Carnegie, effectively leaving Bath.

On 8 April 2018, Beech left Leeds to join Championship rivals Coventry

References

External links
Wasps profile
Guinness Premiership profile

1987 births
Living people
English rugby union players
People from Stevenage
Northampton Saints players
Wasps RFC players
Rugby union props
People educated at Oakham School
Leeds Tykes players